Tanalur (താനാളൂർ)  is a census town in Malappuram district in the state of Kerala, India. It is a suburban town of neighbouring Tanur Municipality and comes under Tanur Block as well as Tanur (State Assembly constituency). It falls under Tirur Taluk.

Wards of Tanalur
{ "type": "ExternalData",  "service": "geoshape",  "ids": "Q13112439"}
Tanalur Grama Panchayat is composed of the following 23 wards:

Demographics
 India census, Tanalur had a population of 40884 with 19542 males and 21342 females.

Visit For More Informations :

Transportation
Tanalur village connects to other parts of India through Tirur town.  National highway No.66 passes through Tirur and the northern stretch connects to Goa and Mumbai.  The southern stretch connects to Cochin and Trivandrum. Highway No.966 goes to Palakkad and Coimbatore. The nearest airport is at Kozhikode.  The nearest major railway station is at Tirur, Tanur. And other mode of transport which is more reliable can be Kerala State Road Transport Corporation buses.

See also
 Puthantheru
 Tanur
 Kingdom of Tanur

References

   Villages in Malappuram district
Populated coastal places in India
Tirur area